M. K. Seetharam Kulal (1940 – 28 July 2019) was an Indian Tulu-Kannada dramatist known for his work in the field of Tulu-Kannada dramas and also in the Tulu film world. He has given several skit performances at Sri Sharav Maha Ganapathi Temple, Mangalore.

Career and awards
Kulal received the "Ranga Kala Bhooshana" award at a function held in the Town Hall of Mangalore in 2001. He became the President of Karnataka Tulu Sahitya Academy in 2005, succeeding Dr. Vaman Nandavar. Kulal has written the Tulu-language books Mannda Magal Abbakka (Queen Abbakka: Daughter of the Soil) and Darmogu Darmada Saval, which were published in 2007. In 2015, Karnataka Tulu Sahitya Academy honored Kulal with a Tulu Academy Award for his work in Tulu theatre. He has written popular "Mokeda Singari" song of a Tulu film.

References

Dramatists and playwrights from Karnataka
Kannada dramatists and playwrights
Tulu people
1940 births
2019 deaths